The 1974–75 FC Bayern Munich season was the club's 10th season in Bundesliga.

Review and events
After a poor first half of the 1974–75 season Udo Lattek was replaced by Dettmar Cramer. In Paris, the club defeated Leeds United with two late goals from Franz Roth and Gerd Müller.

Match results

Legend

Bundesliga

DFB-Pokal

European Cup

References

FC Bayern Munich seasons
Bayern
UEFA Champions League-winning seasons